Lake Munson is a shallow reservoir on the southeast side of Tallahassee in Leon County, Florida.

Historically known as Munson's Mill Pond as early as the 1840s, in 1950 a permanent dam was constructed. From 1934 to 1984, Lake Munson received outflow from the Tallahassee waste water system, leading in 1982 to the Florida Department of Environmental Protection classifying the lake as hypereutrophic and as the seventh most degraded lake in Florida.

Cypress and willow trees line the lake, and egrets, wood storks, and limpkin are often found foraging along the shoreline, often on invasive apple snails. Bass fishing in the lake can be excellent, and a boat ramp is provided at the Gil A. Waters Lake Munson Preserve Park, with another located at the dam.

See also

 Capital Cascade Greenway

References

External links
 Lake Munson Restoration Project
 

Munson
Geography of Tallahassee, Florida
Munson